Kalaga Thalaivan is a 2022 Indian Tamil-language action thriller film written and directed by Magizh Thirumeni and produced by Udhayanidhi Stalin under the banner of Red Giant Movies. The film stars Udhayanidhi Stalin himself, Arav, Nidhhi Agerwal, and Kalaiyarasan in lead roles. The film's music and scored by Srikanth Deva and Arrol Corelli, with cinematography handled by K. Dhillraj and editing done by N. B. Srikanth.

This is a fourth collaboration of N. B. Srikanth and Magizh Thirumeni after Thadaiyara Thaakka, Meaghamann and Thadam. The film predominantly shot in Chennai. The film was released in theatres on 18 November 2022. The film opened to generally positive reviews from critics and became an commercial success.

Plot
In Chennai, Thirumaaran works as a financial analyst for Vahjra Motors, a company which manufactures heavy vehicles. Vahjra launches one of the world's highest mileage giving trucks. Due to this, the stocks rise high, and the company receives profits in the share market. However, Vahjra's CEO Ved Tiwari, who is operating in Mumbai, learns that the vehicles actually emit high amounts of pollutants and decides to keep it confidential, unbeknownst to the 18 board members and 20,000 employees. However, the truth comes into the limelight, which enrages Tiwari and shocking the entire company. 

Tiwari hires Arjun, an ex-commando-turned-private investigator to track down the whistleblower behind the leaking of the matter. Arjun investigates using violent ways and unearths a network of employees working against the company. Arjun suspects JP from Vahjra's Chennai regional headquarters to be the whistleblower and finally catches him. JP tells that he doesn't know about the whistleblower, but reveals about Vahjra's involvement in corporate funding by buying government factories which resulted in people losing jobs, and also reveals about the whistleblowers involved in exposing various international corporates. 

Checking the CCTV footage, Arjun captures Thiru's friend Karthik and kills him, where he also finds that his identity documents are bogus. Arjun finds a surgerical scar in Karthik's body and enquires the hospital about the treatment. He learns that the man posing as Karthik is Gandhi and learns about Thiru, where he also learns that Thiru and Gandhi were best friends who were working as financial analysts in international companies situated in Hong Kong and USA. After learning that Thiru is the whistleblower, Arjun learns about Thiru's guardian Bharathi and tries to use her to trace Thiru, but Bharathi commits suicide.

Arjun finds about Thiru's ex-girlfriend Maithil and manages to trace Thiru and brings him to abandoned chemical factory in order to kill him. However, Thiru manages to finish Arjun's accomplices and fights with Arjun, where Thiru manages to kill him. Later, It is later revealed that Thiru's parents, Gandhi's father and Bharathi's husband were working as chemist in the same abandoned chemical factory, which was purchased by Vahjra Factory. Thiru's parents and Gandhi's father learnt about the chemical pollutants were leaked by Vahjra and files a complaint against them, but they were killed by Tiwari and the corporates. 

Learning that Thiru and Gandhi became whistleblowers in order to expose Vahjra's illegal activities. The next day, Tiwari dies of a stroke after learning that their deal with TVG, a startup company in Germany, is actually been sold to Russian mafia company. Due to association with TVG, Vahjra's business is shut down by the government. It is revealed that the TVG startup's chairman is actually Arjun's friend Vel Murugan and their plan was to attract Vahjra in order to shut down the company. 6 months later, Thiru joins another company to expose their illegal activities as a whistleblower.

Cast
Udhayanidhi Stalin as Thirumaaran 'Thiru'
Nidhhi Agerwal as Maithili Prasad (Voice-over by Deepa Venkat)
Kalaiyarasan as Gandhi/Karthik
Arav as Arjun
Angana Roy as Reba
RJ Vigneshkanth as Velmurugan
Anupama Kumar as Bharathi
Jeeva Ravi as Jayaprakash
Narendra Sachar as Ved Tiwari
Vijay Adhiraj as Keshav Rao

Production
It was announced that Udhayanidhi Stalin would be doing a film with Magizh Thirumeni as the director. On 25 July 2022, the title of the film was announced to be Kalaga Thalaivan with the first look poster of the film being released. It is produced under the banner of Red Giant Movies. It was also reported that, Nidhhi Agerwal was cast in as the female lead opposite Udhayanidhi Stalin. The shooting of the film began on 7 December 2020. Sources reported that Kalaga Thalaivan will be a political-thriller film but Magizh Thirumeni clarified that it would be an action-thriller.

Music

The music is composed by Srikanth Deva and Arrol Corelli while the former did the film score. The audio rights were acquired by Sony Music India. The first single titled "Hey Puyale" was released on 9 November 2022. The second single titled "Neeladho" was released on 11 November 2022.

Release

Theatrical 
The film was released theatrically on 18 November 2022. The trailer of the film was released on 10 November 2022.

Home media 
The digital streaming rights of the film were sold to Netflix, while the satellite rights of the film is sold to Kalaignar TV.

Reception
Kalaga Thalaivan received positive reviews from critics.

M. Suganth of The Times of India rated the film 3 out of 5 stars and wrote "This is felt even more with Thiru and Maithili's romantic track, which mainly feels like something that the filmmaker has introduced as a relief to the tense hide-and-seek between the hero and the villain." A critic for India Herald wrote "Overall, A solid thriller yet again from Magizh Thirumeni!" Kalyani Pandian of ABP Live gave 3 out of 5 stars and wrote "Though the screenplay of Kalaga Thalaivan is interesting, the celebration that is not inherent in Magizh Thirumeni's films, naturally keeps us going through it too." Cineulagam gave the film's rating 2.75 out of 5 and wrote "Srikanth Deva's songs are unimpressive. The background music adds more power to the film." 

Vishal Menon of Film Companion wrote "Even a point it makes about running away from fights, sort of works in a film that isn't about muscle power at all." Kirubhakar Purushothaman of The Indian Express gave 2.5 out of 5 stars and wrote "Despite playing a formulaic role, Arav's character works mainly due to his physical demeanor." Srivatsan S of The Hindu wrote "This is the kind of film that relies on spoon-feeding information, narrative points over voice-over rather than converting them into emotions." Behindwoods rated 2.75 out of 5 and wrote "Kalaga Thalaivan is worth your time, for the well written thriller portions and action scenes." 

Bharathy Singaravel of The News Minute gave 3 out of 5 stars and wrote "If the film had done more to establish what it is that corporate powers do, rather than focusing on a badly written villain like Arjun who is only a means to an end, Kalaga Thalaivan may have been a far stronger film." Navein Darshan of Cinema Express gave 3 out of 5 stars and wrote "It's a competent strike, yes, but just not one enough to knock us out." Thinkal Menon of OTT Play gave the film's rating 3 out of 5 and wrote "The conflict between protagonist and antagonist is the highlight of the movie which could have been better in terms of screenplay."

References

External links
 

2022 films
Films shot in Chennai
2020s Tamil-language films
Indian action thriller films